The Mbarara Northern Bypass Road is a road that bypasses the northern part of Mbarara City.

Location
The road is located in Mbarara City, in the Western Region of Uganda. It starts from Makenke in Kakiika Division, across from the Coca-Cola plant, then it continues northwards to Rwebishuri before reaching Nkokonjeru. The road will then pass through a valley next to Ruharo hill. After crossing River Rwizi, the bypass ends at Katatumba Resort along Kabale road. The geographical coordinates of the bypass road are 0°34'53.0"S, 30°39'30.0"E (Latitude:-0.581389; Longitude:30.658333).

Overview
The road was developed and constructed to decongest the central business district of Mbarara City, by providing an alternative route for large cargo trucks destined for Tanzania, Rwanda, Burundi, or the Democratic Republic of the Congo. The construction of this road was  launched by President Yoweri Museveni on 1 March 2015.

Construction costs
The road was expected to cost about €170 million (US$210 million), of which the European Union was expected to lend about €122 million (US$144 million), with the Uganda government funding the remaining amount €45 million (US$55 million). In March 2015, the China Railway Seventh Group began construction. During the budget speech for the financial year 2018/2019, read on 14 June 2018, Matia Kasaija, the Uganda Minister of Finance, Planning and Economic Development announced that the road had been completed.

See also
 Uganda National Roads Authority
 List of roads in Uganda

References

Mbarara
Mbarara District
Roads in Uganda
Transport infrastructure completed in 2018
2018 establishments in Uganda